Jer'Zhan "Johnny" Newton (born August 31, 2002) is an American football defensive tackle for the Illinois Fighting Illini.

Early life and high school career
Newton attended Clearwater Central Catholic High School in Clearwater, Florida. During his career, he had 244 tackles and 24 sacks. He originally committed to the University of Maryland, College Park to play college football before switching to the University of Illinois Urbana-Champaign.

College career
As a true freshman at Illinois in 2020, Newton played in all eight games with two starts and had 23 tackles and 1.5 sacks. In 2021, he started 11 of 12 games, recording 50 tackles and 3.5 sacks. Newton returned to Illinois in 2022.

References

External links
Illinois Fighting Illini bio

2002 births
Living people
Players of American football from Florida
American football defensive tackles
Illinois Fighting Illini football players